Roaring Spring may refer to:

Roaring Spring, Kentucky, an unincorporated community in Trigg County
Roaring Spring, Pennsylvania, a borough in Blair County
Roaring Spring (Gloucester, Virginia), a historic home located near Gloucester, Gloucester County